Murdestan may refer to:
 Murdestan, Darab, Fars
 Murdestan, Firuzabad, Fars
 Murdestan, South Khorasan